Porfirio Jiménez (born 16 February 1952) is a Bolivian footballer. He played in nine matches for the Bolivia national football team from 1972 to 1977. He was also part of Bolivia's squad for the 1975 Copa América tournament.

References

External links
 

1952 births
Living people
Bolivian footballers
Bolivia international footballers
Association football midfielders
People from Tarija Department